This was the first edition of the tournament.

Grégoire Barrère and Tristan Lamasine won the title after defeating Jonathan Eysseric and Franko Škugor 2–6, 6–3, [10–6] in the final.

Seeds

Draw

References
 Main Draw

Open Sopra Steria de Lyon - Doubles
2016 Doubles